The Prime Ministers of Brazil, officially called President of the Council of Ministers, were the parliamentarians who, during two periods in the political history of the country, directed the government in a parliamentary system. The first parliamentary experience began with emperor Pedro II in 1847, and was maintained during the last 42 years of the Empire of Brazil. The first de jure officeholder was Manuel Alves Branco, Viscount of Caravelas, who was sworn in on 20 July 1847 after the office was formally created by Decree No. 523. The prime ministers were appointed by the emperor of Brazil. Once chosen, it was up to them to form a cabinet.

The second occasion on which a parliamentary system was put into practice occurred during the government of president João Goulart, in 1961, due to a constitutional amendment approved by his opponents before the beginning of his term. This second parliamentary experience was short-lived, with the presidential system of government restored in a national plebiscite in 1963.

Prime ministers of Brazil

Prime ministers of the Empire of Brazil (1847–1889) 

Between 1847 and 1889, the holder of the office was officially called "President of the Council of Ministers", being referred to by the press usually as "President of the Cabinet". According to the Political Constitution of the Empire of Brazil, the head of the Executive Power was the Emperor.

The position of President of the Council of Ministers was created by Decree No. 523 of 20 July 1847, and this parliamentary regime was never included in the Imperial Constitution. The ministerial offices that existed from 1840 to 1847 did not have a President of the council. The number of ministers was small by current Brazilian standards: there were six, and in 1860 the seventh ministry was created by Legislative Decree No. 1,067 of 28 July 1860, the Secretary of State for Agriculture, Commerce and Public Works.

The duration of the Cabinet depended on the support it had in the Chamber of Deputies and on the support of the Emperor. If the Chamber of Deputies were incompatible with the Cabinet, it was up to the Emperor to either dissolve the Cabinet or dissolve the Chamber. There were, in all, 32 cabinets with the figure of the President of the Council of Ministers.

 Parties

Prime ministers of the United States of Brazil (1961–1963) 

The second parliamentary experience lasted from 8 September 1961 to 24 January 1963, therefore one year, four months and sixteen exact days (504 days), when João Goulart was President of Brazil. After 24 January 1963, the presidential regime was reestablished, which remains in the country to the present day.

 Parties

Timeline

Empire of Brazil

Fourth Brazilian Republic

Notes

References 

Prime Ministers of Brazil
Brazilian political people
Brazilian politicians
Brazil